Jukka Santeri Tiensuu (born 30 August 1948) is a Finnish contemporary classical composer, harpsichordist, pianist and conductor.

Career
Tiensuu was born in Helsinki. After extensive musical studies (piano, harpsichord, conducting, composing, historically informed performance, electroacoustic and computer music a.o.t.) at the Sibelius Academy, Helsinki (1967–1972), the Juilliard School, New York (1972–1973), Hochschule für Musik Freiburg (1974–1976), IRCAM, Paris (1978–1982) and other institutes Jukka Tiensuu toured three continents giving numerous concerts with a wide repertoire ranging from the Renaissance to the latest avant-garde and performing both classical and free improvisations. He has received numerous prizes for his compositional work as well as for his recordings and performances. In 2020, he won the Wihuri Sibelius Prize. According to the jury report his "compositions emanate a deep spirituality, and his unwavering adherence to artistic goals is impressive".

Along with over a hundred works in the traditional instrumental, vocal and orchestral fields – in various styles, often microtonal and with electronic or computer music parts – Tiensuu's compositional output also includes many curiosities such as works for Chinese orchestra, accordion ensemble, clarinet choir, instrumental theatre, Baroque orchestra, jazz orchestra, kantele, sheng and works for any ensemble. Most of his works have remained in the repertoire and are available on disc.

His compositions have been premiered by major orchestras and ensembles in three continents by conductors such as Susanna Mälkki, Ernest Bour, Sakari Oramo, Jukka-Pekka Saraste, Lorraine Vaillancourt, Diego Masson, Ilan Volkov, Leif Segerstam, Jacek Kaspszyk, John Storgårds, Hannu Lintu, Dima Slobodeniuk, Yan Huichang, Juha Kangas, Jacques Mercier, Stefan Asbury, among others.

In the late 70's, as the president of the ISCM Finnish Section, Tiensuu started the first ever regular contemporary music concert series in Helsinki. He then became a founder and the first artistic director of Helsinki Biennale (now Musica nova Helsinki) as well as the founder and a long-time artistic director of Time of Music contemporary music festival and summer academy in Viitasaari. His other activities include teaching, writing for books and magazines and making evocative radio programs on both baroque music and on music of our time. According to Finnish Music Quarterly (3/2007) Jukka Tiensuu's influence on the contemporary Finnish music scene is virtually beyond compare.

Awards (selection)
 1973 Koussevitzky Award
 1978 Léonie Sonning Talent Prize
 1979 Gaudeamus International Interpreters Award, 2nd prize (as pianist)
 1987 Record of the Year "The Fantastic Harpsichord" (Finlandia FACD 357)
 1988 International Rostrum of Composers Winner/Selected work (Tokko)
 1996 Erik Bergman Prize
 1999 Janne Award (Best solo album) for "The Frivolous Harpsichord"
 2003 First prize for oddjob (given by the audience) at Hultgren Solo Cello Works Biennial
 2004 First prize for Lots in the Aliénor Awards composition competition
 2004 Teosto Prize for the most original and innovative work in 2004 (Umori)
 2006 Emma Award (Best Classical Album) for "Minds and Moods" (Alba Records ABCD 224)
 2008 Emma Award (Best Classical Album) for "Gamba nova" (Musica ambigua on Alba Records ABCD 259)
 2008 Record of the year for "nemo, Puro, Spiriti" (Alba Records ABCD 258)
 2008 Pizzicato magazine "Supersonic Award" and Süddeutsche Zeitung "Best Record" (Erz on Hänssler Classic)
 2010 Emma Award (Best Classical Album) "Tiensuu Plus" (Alba Records ABCD 287)
 2012 Finnish State Prize
 2015 Record of the year (Rack on Alba Records ABCD 383)
 2015 Pro Musica award
 2019 Coup de cœur des Jeunes Mélomanes (Fondation Prince Pierre de Monaco) for Teoton
 2020 Wihuri Sibelius Prize

Discography
 Compositions and performances.

Works (selection)
Tiensuu's works are available from his home page www.tiensuu.fi (downloadable) and Musicfinland.fi (printed sheet music)

 1972	Cadenza (on one note) for flute
 1972	Ouverture for flute and harpsichord
 1974	Four Etudes for flute
 1974	preLUDI, LUDI and postLUDI for guitar
 1975	Aspro for clarinet, trombone, cello and piano
 1975	Rubato for any ensemble of melody instruments
 1976	Prélude non-mesuré for piano
 1977	Sinistro for accordion and guitar
 1977	Mxpzkl for orchestra
 1978–79	Yang for two ensembles
 1979	Narcissus for oboe and tape
 1980	Tombeau de Beethoven for oboe or clarinet, cello, piano, and sampler or tape
 1980	Passage for soprano voice, ensemble and live-electronics
 1980	M concerto for microtonally tuned harpsichord, percussion and string orchestra
 1981	/L for piano 4-hands and optional live-electronics
 1982	P=Pinocchio? for soprano voice, ensemble and computer
 1984	Fantango for any keyboard instrument
 1985	Tango lunaire for oboe or flute, clarinet, violin, cello and any keyboard instrument
 1985	mutta for three accordions
 1987	Tokko for male choir and tape
 1988	Manaus for kantele
 1989	Puro concerto for clarinet and orchestra
 1990	Grround for piano
 1990	Tombeau de Mozart for clarinet, violin and piano
 1990	Arsenic and Old Lace for microtonally tuned harpsichord and string quartet
 1993	Sound of Life radiophonic piece
 1993	Halo a symphony for orchestra in three parts
 1994	Plus V concerto for accordion and string orchestra
 1994	Ai for 6-track tape
 1995	Vento for clarinet choir
 1995	oddjob for violin or viola or cello and live electronics
 1995–98	Alma: I Himo, II Lumo, III Soma for orchestra and sampler
 1996	Aion for two accordions
 1996	Fra Tango for three accordions
 1997	Padrigal for male choir
 1997	nemo for ensemble and electronics
 1997	Beat for clarinet, cello and piano
 1998	Drang for guitar
 1998	Musica ambigua for baroque ensemble (recorder, violin, viol, harpsichord)
 1999	Asteletsa for walking bassoonist or bass clarinetist
 1999	Mood stereophonic music for orchestra
 2000	Ember concertino for microtonal flute and ensemble
 2000	Koi for orchestra
 2000	Etudes: 1. train 2. drain 3, grain for harpsichord
 2000	Mind concerto for piano and orchestra
 2001	Tri for three pianos
 2002	Zolo for accordion
 2003	Lots for baroque ensemble (recorder or traverso flute, violin, viol or cello, harpsichord)
 2004	Umori for jazz orchestra (Big band)
 2005	Spiriti concerto for accordion and orchestra
 2005	Aim concerto for guitar and orchestra
 2005	Balzo for cello
 2006	Ote for cello and contrabass
 2006	Tanzikone for recorder, trombone and cello
 2007	Erz 14 companion pieces for J. S. Bach's Goldberg Variations (for accordion)
 2007	Missa concerto for clarinet and orchestra
 2007	Vie concerto for orchestra
 2007	Hei for four melody instruments (tribute to Paavo Heininen)
 2008	False Memories I-III Morphoses for orchestra
 2008	Sun Games for orchestra (tribute to Magnus Lindberg)
 2008	Doch – Apotheose von Papa Haydn for string quartet
 2008	Ikisyyt for ensemble
 2008	Rack for string quartet
 2009	Blow/Blau fanfares for three wind instrument trios
 2010	Nous for clarinet, violin, viola, cello and piano
 2010	bLeuelein for cello (tribute to Anssi Karttunen)
 2011	Bleu-El for contrabass
 2011	Sulci for string orchestra
 2011	Egregore microtonal music for kantele, guitar, accordion and piano
 2011	Brandi a 2nd movement for J. S. Bach's 3rd Brandenburg concerto
 2011	Kvagmaa for two string quartets tuned a quarter-tone apart
 2012	Voice Verser for soprano voice and orchestra
 2012	Hou concerto for violin and ensemble
 2012	Mora for tenor voice and baroque or small orchestra
 2012	Armotta for viola, guitar and cello
 2012	Kalaasi a theatrical piece for flute, clarinet, trombone and contrabass (tribute to Kaija Saariaho)
 2013	Egeiro for piano left hand
 2014	Hehkuu stereophonic music for sheng and ensemble
 2014	Oire concerto for cello and orchestra
 2015	Anomal Dances concerto for quarter-tone accordion and orchestra
 2015	Ihmix for Chinese orchestra
 2015	Kuuhiomo for any ensemble of melody instruments
 2015	Teoton concerto for sheng and orchestra
 2016	Tarinaoopperabaletti concerto for electric cello and ensemble
 2016	Daydreams for guitar and electronics
 2017	Sinfoniaviis for orchestra
 2017	Suuna concerto for trombone and orchestra
 2017	Appo concerto for recorder and orchestra
 2017	Innuo for baroque orchestra
 2018	Collateral three solos as string trio
 2018	Tuleks a fanfare for ensemble

External links
Homepage of the composer 
Nieminen, Risto. Notes from a borderland: The composer Jukka Tiensuu
Music Finland's page Includes Tiensuu's list of works, biographical information, articles, audio clips and PDF scores
Finnish Broadcasting Company. Includes a recording of Jukka Tiensuus Aim for guitar and orchestra
Sävellyspaja Composition Masterclass & Workshop

1948 births
20th-century classical composers
21st-century classical composers
21st-century conductors (music)
21st-century male musicians
21st-century pianists
Finnish classical composers
Finnish conductors (music)
Finnish harpsichordists
Finnish male composers
Finnish pianists
International Rostrum of Composers prize-winners
Living people
Musicians from Helsinki
20th-century male musicians
20th-century Finnish composers
21st-century Finnish composers